Juniperus thurifera (Spanish juniper) is a species of juniper native to the mountains of the western Mediterranean region, from southern France (including Corsica) across eastern and central Spain to Morocco and locally in northern Algeria.

The foliage is strongly aromatic with a spicy-resinous scent. It is dioecious with separate male and female plants. The cones are berry-like, 7–12 mm in diameter, blue-black with a whitish waxy bloom, and contain 1–4 seeds; they are mature in about 18 months. The male cones are 3–4 mm long, and shed their pollen in early spring.

There are two varieties, regarded as distinct by some authors, but not by others:
Juniperus thurifera var. thurifera. Spain, France. Mature cones 8–12 mm, with 2–4 seeds.
Juniperus thurifera var. africana Maire. Morocco, Algeria. Mature cones 7–8 mm, with 1–2 seeds.

Overall, the species is not considered threatened with healthy population in Spain; however, the African population is threatened by severe overgrazing, mainly by goats, and is listed as Endangered.

The largest Spanish Juniper forest in Europe is in the Sierra de Solorio.

References

thurifera
Flora of North Africa
Flora of Spain
Plants described in 1753
Taxa named by Carl Linnaeus
Dioecious plants